The 1893–94 season was the second in the history of the Bristol & District League, which was renamed the Western League in 1895. After a single division the previous season, a second division was formed, mostly of reserve teams from Division One clubs.

Warmley were the Division One champions again, having won the league in its initial season the previous year. Their reserve team won the new Division Two.

Division One

Two new clubs joined Division One for this season, increasing the number of clubs from nine to ten after the resignation of Wells City.
Gloucester
Staple Hill

Division Two
Ten teams formed the new Division Two, including seven reserve teams from Division One clubs.

References

 

1893
1893–94 in English association football leagues